Caballeros de Montevideo (Knights of Montevideo), is a non-profit organization in Uruguay which holds events to promote role-playing games and gather donations for charity causes. It was founded in 2002, and continues to hold at least three annual events, as well as participating in fan events held by other organizations.

See also
 Montevideo Comics, Uruguay's first comic book (and related activities) convention.
 Continuará..., Uruguayan costume, comics, and other related activities event.

References

External links 
 
 
 Article (in Spanish) on roleplaying games in Uruguay, mentioning the Knights of Montevideo, with quotes by one of the founders (El Espectador)

Role-playing game associations
Role-playing conventions
Fandom
Entertainment in Uruguay
Organizations established in 2002
2002 establishments in Uruguay